Hippo is the name of a fictional supervillain appearing in American comic books published by Marvel Comics.

Publication history
Hippo first appeared in Dark Reign: The Sinister Spider-Man #1 and was created by Brian Reed, Chris Bachalo, and Tim Townsend.

Fictional character biography
Hippo is an ordinary zoo hippopotamus named "Mrs. Fluffy Lumpkins" (this was the name given to the hippopotamus despite the fact that it was a male) who was turned into a humanoid version of himself by the High Evolutionary. While on a crime spree upon being unable to find work in this form, he had his left leg eaten by Venom (who was masquerading as Spider-Man during the time when he was a member of the Dark Avengers). After that experience, he joined up with the Redeemers alongside Dementoid, Doctor Everything, Eleven, and General Wolfram in a plan to redeem "Spider-Man". During the meeting of the Redeemers' allies, Hippo mentions his background as those who had their limbs eaten off by Venom and are outfitted with cybernetic parts. When it came time for the Redeemers' gang to attack "Spider-Man", Hippo is rammed into General Wolfram when "Spider-Man" delivers a strong headbutt that did this.

Hippo is later seen fighting the New Avengers members Spider-Man and Ronin. During this appearance, Hippo is shown to have his original left leg as if it was somehow restored. Both of them have a hard time taking down Hippo, who is ultimately defeated when Luke Cage falls on him.

During the Origin of the Species storyline, Hippo is among the supervillains gathered by Doctor Octopus to secure specific items for him in exchange for a reward.

Hippo next visits an underground casino in New York City that catered to the supervillain clientele where Hippo does badly at the tables. When Daredevil and Domino crash the casino, Tiger Shark asked Hippo for help. Hippo declined since he had enough losses for the night.

Hippo begins attending Super Villains Anonymous meetings that was held at a church and also attended by Boomerang, Doctor Bong, Grizzly, Looter, Mirage, Porcupine II, and others. Hippo listened to Mirage's tale of woes and even gave Mirage a hug. He even offers a hug to the disgusted Boomerang. Hippo attended another Supervillains Anonymous meeting. He listened to Grizzly and Looter where they tell about their run-ins with Spider-Man.

Hippo later appears as a member of the Menagerie which also consists of Skein, White Rabbit, and a new villain called Panda-Mania. They were on a rampage stealing expensive eggs from an auction until Spider-Man arrives. Hippo throws cars at Spider-Man while claiming that the eggs would "secure his future." He and the Menagerie are defeated by Spider-Man despite the fact that Skein used her powers to destroy Spider-Man's outfit. Hippo and the rest of the Menagerie later reunite to commit a diamond heist, but they are once again defeated by Spider-Man.

Later, Hippo appeared by himself attempting to rob a bank that was being guarded by Squirrel Girl. After a brief fight with Squirrel Girl, Chipmunk Hunk, and Koi Boi, he was convinced by Squirrel Girl to look into a job in demolition at which point he agrees and leaves without issue. Hippo did state that if this doesn't work out, he'll be returning to the bank to finish the job.

At the time when a Duplicate Squirrel Girl defeated most of Earth's superhumans and banished them to the Negative Zone, she found that she overlooked Hippo. Squirrel Girl assembled Hippo, Agent Venom, Kraven the Hunter, and Rocket Raccoon to help her and her allies make a stand against the Duplicate Squirrel Girl. While the Duplicate Squirrel Girl found Hippo to be "easily-tossable," he and the others bought Squirrel Girl some time to rescue the other superhumans from the Negative Zone and defeat Duplicate Squirrel Girl.

During the "Hunted" storyline, Hippo is among the animal-themed characters captured by Taskmaster and Black Ant for Kraven the Hunter's "Great Hunt" sponsored by Arcade's company Arcade Industries. He was seen watching Spider-Man fight Scorpion until the Hunter-Bots created by Arcade Industries arrive. Hippo later joins the animal-themed characters in fighting the Hunter-Bots. He is later freed when Kraven the Hunter has Arcade lower the forcefield around Central Park.

Powers and abilities
Hippo possesses superhuman strength and has a hard hide that is durable. He is also shown to be very adept in the water.

Reception
 In 2020, CBR.com ranked Hippo 4th in their "Spider-Man: 10 Weirdest Animal Villains From The Comics That We'd Like To See In The MCU" list.

In other media

Television
Hippo appears in the Spider-Man episode "Bring on the Bad Guys" Pt. 1, voiced by Zack Shada. This version sports a cybernetic leg (similar to his appearance in the "Dark Reign" storyline) and his previous name of Mrs. Fluffy Lumpkins is often mentioned. He and Panda-Mania came to New York City from Toledo to attend a meeting and commit a heist which attracted the attention of Spider-Man. After collapsing part of the subway to distract Spider-Man, Hippo and Panda-Mania make their way to the meeting. When they hear from a mysterious person (later revealed to be Doctor Octopus' mind in Living Brain) that there is a bounty on Spider-Man, Hippo and Panda-Mania take their leave as Panda-Mania agrees to take Hippo to the local wax museum.

Trivia
The Hippo alias was first used for a Consultant that was encountered by Underworld''.

References

External links
 Hippo at Marvel.com
 Hippo at Marvel Wiki
 Hippo at Comic Vine
 

Marvel Comics animals
Marvel Comics supervillains
Marvel Comics male supervillains
Fictional amputees
Fictional characters with superhuman durability or invulnerability
Fictional hippopotamuses
Fictional humanoids
Marvel Comics characters with superhuman strength